Geneva is the third full-length album by the instrumental rock band Russian Circles, and was released on October 20, 2009. The album was recorded in May 2009 with Brandon Curtis of The Secret Machines. The vinyl version of the album was released by Sargent House and was available on both a black 2x12" 45 rpm edition and a more limited clear 2x12" 45 rpm edition.

Tracks

Personnel
 Mike Sullivan − guitar
 Dave Turncrantz − drums
 Brian Cook − bass guitar
 Alison Chesley − cello
 Susan Voelz − violin
 Greg Norman − engineering, trumpet, trombone
 Brandon Curtis − production, additional piano
 Joe Lambert − mastering
 Chris Strong − album photo
 Sasha Barr − album layout

Charts

References 

2009 albums
Russian Circles albums
Suicide Squeeze Records albums